APBA (pronounced "APP-bah") is a game company founded in Lancaster, Pennsylvania. It was created in 1951 by trucking firm purchaser J. Richard Seitz (1915-1992). The acronym stands for "American Professional Baseball Association", the name of a board game league Seitz devised in 1931 with eight high school classmates. After World War II, he formed APBA Game Co., working out of his living room. In 2011, after 60 years in Pennsylvania, the company headquarters was moved to Alpharetta, Georgia.

The company's first offering was a baseball simulation table game using cards to represent each major league player, boards to represent different on-base scenarios (e.g. "Bases Empty", "Runners on First and Third," "Bases Loaded"), and dice to generate random numbers.  Seitz's mail-order product derived from the game National Pastime, invented and patented by Clifford Van Beek in 1925, a game that Seitz played in his youth. The game can be played against another person or solitaire. Devoted fans keep track of the results and assess how players' performances compare to their real-life statistics.

The game company later produced football, golf, basketball, hockey, bowling, boxing, soccer, and saddle racing games modeled after the baseball game (cards, boards, and dice).

In the 1980s and 1990s, computer adaptations of some of these games were produced.

APBA enthusiasts have included Presidents George H. W. Bush and George W. Bush; presidential son-in-law David Eisenhower; New York mayor Ed Koch; actor Jeff Daniels; ballplayers Bump Wills,  Jim Sundberg and Dave Magadan; sports agent and Detroit Pistons vice chairman Arn Tellem; and journalist and memoirist Franz Lidz.

For much of its history APBA's main competitor has been Strat-O-Matic. Other rivals include, or have included, Replay Publishing, Statis Pro Baseball, MLB Showdown and, in APBA's early years, Big League Manager. In 2000 APBA redesigned the packaging of its baseball game and for a brief time expanded its marketing approach to include hobby shops and sport card dealers, with limited success.

Computer versions of the baseball game 
In 1984, the game company authorized a computer version of an advanced "master" version of their baseball game.  It was published by Random House in 1985, first for PC computers and later for Apple.  McGraw-Hill became the publisher after the company acquired Random House's software division in 1989, and the original game developers, Miller Associates, took over publishing and sales in 1990.

In 1993, Miller and APBA announced a version of the game for the Windows platform, and it came out that summer. It received a perfect 10 out of 10 score from Electronic Entertainment. Titled APBA Presents Baseball for Windows (with the first two words in small print), Miller continued to update and publish the game software; their final version, 5.5, came out in the summer of 1999.  Late in 2000, APBA announced that it had agreed to take over sales and service for the game; Miller Associates disbanded.

In February 2007 the APBA Game Company announced that they had acquired the rights to the Baseball for Windows code, and planned an upgrade to be released in the fall of 2008, featuring the voice of Pete Van Wieren, replacing the earlier editions' Ernie Harwell. Complications in game development, as well as errors in the code that had gone long unrepaired, delayed the release.  As of November 2011, the current release schedule has not been announced. The current version of the game runs on Windows 7 in 32-bit mode. For 64 bit versions of Windows 7, it requires Virtual Mode software.  Some APBA players maintain computers with older versions of Windows solely for running the APBA software.

In August 2012, APBA released an updated version of Baseball for Windows 5.5, called APBA Computer Baseball version 5.75.  The game came with 3 complete major league seasons(1921, 1961, and 2011). This release was updated again in 2015 with the seasons included changed to 1957, 1976, and 2014. Game players can order additional disks individually for all major league seasons from 1901 through the present, with other special disks also available.

Reception
Computer Gaming World in 1992 criticized aspects of version 1.5's interface, but praised the sophistication of the MicroManager module's BaseballTalk language for creating custom managers for simulated games. The magazine called APBA "a work in progress, an impressive baseball park under construction ... but for what it delivers today, at the price asked, APBA Baseball would not be my first choice".

Computer Gaming World in 1993 approved of the "gorgeous" ballparks, sophisticated drafting and statistical options, and "easy-to-use interface" of APBA Presents: Baseball for Windows. The magazine concluded that the developers should "be congratulated for making a true Windows product", with "realistic representation of baseball".

APBA Baseball for Windows was a finalist for Computer Gaming Worlds Sports Game of the Year award, losing to Front Page Sports Football Pro. The editors wrote that despite new graphics "it is still the statistical model and replay accuracy of this new game, like its venerable ancestor, that command's everyone's attention".

Conventions and tournaments 
APBA continues to have a devoted following, with conventions now held every year under the game company's sponsorship.  The highlight of the convention is a tournament played by the attendees.

APBA conventions go back as far as June 1973, when more than 300 fans got together at the Bellevue-Stratford Hotel in Philadelphia for a convention sponsored by the game's independent publication, the APBA Journal.  David Eisenhower was among the attendees. The convention tournament was won by Robert Weeks.  A record 650 got together in New York City in June 1975, with Barry Koopersmith the tournament winner.  The third and final APBA Journal convention was held in June 1976 in Philadelphia, with Richard Beggs winning the tournament.  The tournament structure for those conventions allowed participants to construct a team from all the cards they owned.

(The Journal continued to be published under different management until 2002, but never held another convention.)

Conventions resumed in Lancaster in July 1995 under game company sponsorship.  The tournament was limited to stock teams that finished with percentages between .480 and .515.  Chris Dineen's 1982 Expos prevailed.  The June 1998 tournament, held in nearby Millersville, was limited to teams with percentages below .550.  Ten-year-old Devin Flawd won, using the 1995 Mariners.

Conventions have been held annually beginning in 2001.  All except 2003 were sponsored by the game company.  The limits on team winning percentages were dropped after 2002.

The 2013 convention was held near the new corporate offices in Georgia; it was unique in that it produced the first back-to-back tournament winner.  In addition, Brian Wells, a two-time winner himself, was inducted into the APBA Hall of Fame along with his father, Greg Wells.

Convention tournament results
Year - Location - Winner - Team

 1973 - Philadelphia PA - Bob Weeks (All Star Teams were used)
 1975 - New York City - Barry Koopersmith (All Star Teams were used)
 1973 - New York City - Richard Beggs (All Star Teams were used)
 1999 - Lancaster, PA - Mini-Camp - Karl Hasselbarth - 1978 Texas Rangers def Ted Knorr - 1978 Pittsburgh Pirates
 2001 - Lancaster, PA - Paul Cunningham - 1976 Athletics def Sam Adams  - 1970 Boston Red Sox
 2002 - Lancaster, PA - Brian Wells#* - 2000 Diamondbacks def Art Carter - 1992 St Louis Cardinals
 2003 - Lancaster, PA - Todd Davis - 1977 Royals**  def. Devin Flawd - 1982 Phillies
 2004 - Las Vegas, NV - Eric Naftaly - 1957 Braves def. Joe Krakowski - 1969 Orioles
 2005 - Lancaster, PA - John Hunt - 1975 Reds def. Frank Welsh - 1957 Braves
 2006 - Las Vegas, NV - Bob King - 1977 Phillies def. Jackson Chapman - 1930 Athletics
 2007 - Frazer, PA - John Duke* - 1927 Yankees def. Dan Trout - 1970 Orioles
 2008 - Las Vegas, NV - Brian Wells* - 2001 Mariners def. Mike Harlow - 1956 Dodgers
 2009 - Lancaster, PA - John Duke*  - 1909 Pirates def. Walt Husted - 1930 Cardinals
 2010 - Lancaster, PA - Ron Seamans - 1969 Orioles def. Brian Wells - 2004 Cardinals
 2011 - Lancaster, PA - Chris Sorce - 1930 Cardinals def. Ray Ouellette 1911 Giants
 2012 - Lancaster, PA - Steve Skoff* - 1912 Giants def. Charlie Sorce - 1910 A's
 2013 - Alpharetta, GA - Steve Skoff§* - 1911 Giants def. Pat McGregor - 1995 Indians
 2013 - Canton, OH - (Football) - Greg Wells 1984 Forty-Niners def. Greg Barath - 1999 St. Louis Rams
 2014 - Alpharetta, GA - Paul Trinkle - 1916 Dodgers def. Leroy "Skeet" Carr - 2011 Rangers
 2015 - Alpharetta, GA - Kevin Cluff - 1998 Yankees def. Billy Bell - 2013 Tigers
 2016 - Alpharetta, GA - Roy Langhans - 1985 Cardinals def. Steve Ryan - 1998 Braves
 2017 - Alpharetta, GA - Dave Sweeley - 1972 Pirates def. Bill Lilly - 1968 Tigers
 2018 - Alpharetta, GA - Greg Wells - 1905 New York Giants def. Steve Ryan - 1998 Atlanta Braves
 2019 - Alpharetta, GA - Amy Wyks° - 2017 Washington Nationals def. Mike Kehrer - 2017 Washington Nationals
 2021 - Alpharetta, GA - Steve Skoff@ - 2019 Los Angeles Dodgers def. Kevin Cluff - 2019 Los Angeles Dodgers
 2022 - Alpharetta, GA - Mike Kehrer - 2021 Atlanta Braves def. Greg Wells 2019 Houston Astros

Key:
 @Three-time Champion
 *Two-time champions
 #Youngest champion (Age 9 in 2002)
 §First Back-to-Back Champion
 °First female champion
 **The 2003 Tournament was held in Lancaster, PA, but was not officially sponsored by the APBA Game Company. Todd Davis was the champion.

Face-to-face and mail leagues 
A large part of the APBA world is players competing against one another in a wide variety of draft leagues, where players assemble teams and play against other competitors.  Some leagues have lasted over four decades, and FTF (face-to-face) leagues are centered in Philadelphia, Greater New York and Washington, D.C.

References

External links
 Official website
 Newsday story about the effect of APBA and Strat-O-Matic
 Game company press release about the new version of Baseball for
 APBA Between the Lines Delphi Discussion Forum
 APBA Baseball Game
 APBA, A Yahoo discussion group on APBA baseball
 2009 New York Times article about the game

Game manufacturers
Sports board games
Manufacturing companies established in 1951
Companies based in Lancaster, Pennsylvania
1951 establishments in Pennsylvania
Design companies established in 1951
Baseball board games